Dressed to Kill may refer to:

Film 
 Dressed to Kill (1928 film), an American silent film starring Mary Astor
 Dressed to Kill (1941 film), an American crime film starring Lloyd Nolan
 Dressed to Kill (1946 film), a Sherlock Holmes film starring Basil Rathbone and Nigel Bruce
 Dressed to Kill (1980 film), an American thriller directed by Brian De Palma

Music 
 Dressed to Kill (album), a 1975 album by Kiss
 "Dressed to Kill" (song), a 2009 song by Preston, covered by Cher
 "Dressed to Kill", a song by Lita Ford from Dancin' on the Edge
 "Dressed to Kill", a song by Nazareth from 'Snaz
 "Dressed to Kill", a song by New Found Glory from New Found Glory
 "Dressed to Kill", a song by The Nolans
 "Dressed to Kill", a song by Symphony X from The Damnation Game

Other 
 Dressed to Kill (book), a 1995 book by Sydney Ross Singer and Soma Grismaijer
 "Dressed to Kill" (The Avengers), an episode of The Avengers
 Dressed to Kill, an episode of Forensic Files
 Dressed to Kill Tour, a 2014 tour by the singer Cher
 Dressed to Kill Tour, a 1975 tour by the band Kiss

See also 
 Dress to Kill (disambiguation)